ALFA International The Global Legal Network Inc., commonly known as ALFA International, is a global legal network consisting of 150 independent law firms, including 80 U.S. law firms and 70 member firms in other countries.
As with other types of professional services networks, the organization serves as a business referral and resource pooling network between member law firms.

History 

The organization, which was originally named the American Law Firm Association, was founded in 1980. It is the oldest U.S.-based law firm network
At its creation, it consisted of 12 U.S. law firms that performed insurance defense work for insurance companies with nationwide operations.
During the 1980s, ALFA expanded to include more than 60 law firms in the United States. The membership included firms that handled other types of litigation, not just insurance defense, as well as transactional legal work.
During the 1990s, ALFA membership grew to include 80 law firms in the United States and 25 law firms in Europe, Latin American, and the Pacific Rim.
During the 2000s, ALFA expanded its international membership to include 60 member firms.

Membership 

As of 2019, the ALFA International network comprises approximately 150 law firms and approximately 10,000 lawyers  in 300 offices worldwide.
ALFA International membership is exclusive to one law firm in each metropolitan area, state, or country. Member law firms are full-service corporate firms and, on average, each firm consists of approximately 75 attorneys. Firms must undergo a rigorous application process prior to being admitted to the organization. Member firms are then regularly audited, and underperforming firms may be removed from membership.
Member law firms have no legal ties to one another.

See also 
 Umbrella organization
 Business networking
 Professional services networks
 Multidisciplinary professional services networks
 Law firm network

References

External links 
IRS Form 990 filings for 2009–2011

Professional networks
Business and industry organizations based in Chicago
Legal organizations in Chicago
Organizations established in 1980
1980 establishments in Illinois
501(c)(6) nonprofit organizations